The 2015 African Volleyball Championship U19 was held in Kelibia, Tunisia from 21 to 24 January 2015. All 3 teams qualified for the 2015 U19 World Championship.

Teams
 (Hosts)

Results

|}

|}

* This match was originally scheduled for 22 January, but it was postponed.

Final standing

Awards
Best Spiker
  Marwouan Moustafa
Best Setter
  Zyad Elsisy

References

External links
Official website

African Volleyball Championship U19
Volleyball Championship U19
2015 in Tunisian sport
African Volleyball Championships
January 2015 sports events in Africa
International volleyball competitions hosted by Tunisia